Roser's Cross is a village in the Wealden district of East Sussex.

Villages in East Sussex